Kicked in the Head were a ska punk band founded in Boston, Massachusetts in the mid-1990s. Known for Halloween shows with Big D and The Kids Table, the band signed with the label run by Big D, Fork in Hand Records, and released their debut album World Domination in 1997.
They went on to appear on the Warped Tour in 1998 and opened for The Mighty Mighty Bosstones.

In 1999 the band was selected to play in the WBCN Rock & Roll Rumble. They again toured on the Warped Tour in 2003, and appeared on the Warped Tour 2003 Tour Compilation album. Kicked in the Head disbanded in 2005.

Discography

Studio albums
World Domination (1997)
Thick as Thieves (2000)

EPs
All in the Family (1998) (split with The Goonies)
Salita (2002)

Compilation appearances
Boston Drops the Gloves: A Tribute to Slapshot (1999)
Warped Tour 2003 Tour Compilation (2003)
In Honor: A Compilation to Beat Cancer (2004)

Members
Gary Hedrick - vocals
Ryan Dowd - bass guitar
Matt Sanocki - guitar
Anthony Modano - drums
Ryan Overbeck - vocals, keyboards
Jonathan Togo - alto saxophone
Matt Rositano - trombone, guitar

References

Musical groups from Boston